Attack, also known as Attack!, is a 1956 American war film directed by Robert Aldrich and starring Jack Palance, Eddie Albert, Lee Marvin, William Smithers, Robert Strauss, Richard Jaeckel, Buddy Ebsen and Peter van Eyck. The cinematographer was Joseph Biroc.

"A cynical and grim account of war", the film is set in the latter stages of World War II and tells the story of a front-line combat unit led by a cowardly captain clearly out of his depth, as well as a tougher subordinate and an executive officer who both threaten to do away with him. As the official trailer put it: "Not every gun is pointed at the enemy!"

The film won the 1956 Italian Film Critics Award.

Plot
Europe 1944: Fox company (call sign "Fragile Fox") is a US Army National Guard infantry unit based in a Belgian town near the front line. They are led by Captain Erskine Cooney (Eddie Albert), who appears to be better at handling red tape than combat. When Lieutenant Joe Costa (Jack Palance) sends a squad to take a pillbox, Cooney agrees to provide covering fire but freezes at the critical moment leading to the slaughter of Costa's squad.

The executive officer, Lt. Harold Woodruff (William Smithers, in his first credited screen role), is the "voice of reason" who tries to keep the peace between Cooney and Costa. Woodruff approaches battalion commander Lieutenant Colonel Clyde Bartlett (Lee Marvin), who is a career officer intent on leveraging Cooney's family ties for political gain when the war ends. When Woodruff tries to appeal to Bartlett's honour and claims that Cooney is not capable of leading the unit and should be reassigned to a desk job, Bartlett dismisses him. Woodruff is promised that the war is coming to an end and it is highly unlikely that the platoon will ever see combat again. It is well known that Cooney owes his position to Bartlett, who has known the Cooney family since he was a 14-year-old clerk in the office of Cooney's father, a politically powerful judge. The judge's influence could be very useful to Bartlett's post-war political ambitions.

When the Germans launch the Battle of the Bulge, Bartlett orders Cooney to seize the town of La Nelle. Woodruff recommends a two-pronged attack but is over-ruled by Cooney who orders Costa to lead a reconnaissance mission. Costa agrees, provided that  both Cooney and Woodruff promise to send reinforcements if his squads encounter heavy resistance. As the platoon approaches La Nelle, the men come under fire – the town, as it turns out, is strongly held by German troops backed up by mortars and tanks.

Most of Costa's platoon are killed or wounded. He and the survivors (Platoon Sergeant Tolliver, Private First Class Bernstein, Pfc. Ricks and Pvt, Snowden) take refuge in a farmhouse. When Costa calls for reinforcements, Cooney ignores his request and begins drinking. Costa and his men capture a German SS officer and a soldier.  But when tanks start shelling the house, he has no choice but to retreat. He furiously tells Woodruff over the radio to warn Cooney that he's "coming back!"

As the survivors flee, Ricks is shot and badly injured, Tolliver, Snowden and Bernstein each run past the man but Costa is unable to leave him behind and attempts to carry Ricks to safety. Ricks dies in Costa's arms and in the ensuing barrage Costa goes missing in action. The rest of the men manage to get back to town. The men show their contempt for Cooney. Bartlett reprimands Cooney for failing to send in his entire company to take La Nelle. As a result, the Germans are advancing on their position; he tells Woodruff and Cooney that they must hold. Bartlett threatens to arrest Cooney if he falls back, as it would leave another company unprotected and the Germans would be able to "roll up the entire front line". When Cooney begs to be reassigned, an enraged Bartlett strikes him.

Woodruff threatens Bartlett saying he will tell the commanding general, Gen. Parsons, the whole story. With the pressure building up inside him, Cooney turns to drink again, but Woodruff smashes the bottle. After that, Cooney has a mental breakdown. Feeling sorry for him, Woodruff tells him to sleep it off and is about to assume command when Costa suddenly reappears, determined to kill Cooney. As they argue, they are told by Corporal Jackson (Jon Shepodd) that the town is being overrun and that the surviving members of Costa's squad are cut off. Costa takes it on himself to save his men and grabs a bazooka, he manages to disable one tank but is gravely wounded when another tank he disables drives over his arm, crushing it and pinning him down.

Woodruff, Tolliver, Bernstein, Jackson and Snowden (Richard Jaeckel) take refuge in a basement, followed shortly afterward by Cooney. Bernstein's leg is broken when a beam falls on it. As the men try to get back to their own lines they discover that they are surrounded. Cooney orders the men to surrender and just as he steps out of the basement to do so he is met by a severely injured Costa, his grievously mangled and bloody arm dangling uselessly. It is clear that Costa is gravely wounded and, as he collapses to the ground in front of Cooney, he appeals to God to give him enough strength to kill Cooney.  Before Costa dies, Cooney mocks him by kicking his pistol away. Cooney then orders the remaining survivors to surrender, even though they have not been discovered. Woodruff angrily refuses, as there are members of the SS in the advancing German troops, and Bernstein is Jewish and injured. Surrendering would be a guaranteed death sentence for Bernstein as Woodruff knows the SS will not honour his POW rights.

Woodruff demands that Cooney relent, and threatens to shoot his commanding officer if he tries to proceed. When Cooney continues, Woodruff, with no other choice, shoots and kills the captain. Feeling remorse, Woodruff instructs Tolliver to place him under arrest, but Tolliver and the other GIs reject his command. Each man, except Snowden, steps forward and shoots Cooney to prevent Woodruff from taking the blame. Snowden returns to report that the town is empty and American reinforcements are arriving with the Germans in full retreat.

Bartlett finds the men and demands to speak to Cooney; the men point to his body. The men then intervene before Woodruff can confess and inform the Colonel that Cooney was killed by the Germans, but Bartlett senses immediately that they are covering for Woodruff. He dismisses the men and, alone with Woodruff, tries to bribe the younger officer with a field promotion to captain. Woodruff reluctantly seems to go along until Bartlett then announces that he is going to nominate Cooney for the Distinguished Service Cross award. Outraged, Woodruff accuses Bartlett of orchestrating the whole thing in order to get rid of Cooney and gain favour with his powerful father. Bartlett remarks that Woodruff has too much to lose if he makes the whole affair public, and leaves after promising to get a medal for Costa too. As he leaves Woodruff decides to do the right thing to honour Costa, and calls the commanding general, Gen. Parsons, on the radio to file a full report.

Cast

 Jack Palance as Lt. Joe Costa
 Eddie Albert as Capt. Erskine Cooney
 Lee Marvin as Lt. Col. Clyde Bartlett
 William Smithers as Lt. Harold "Harry" Woodruff
 Robert Strauss as Pfc. Bernstein
 Richard Jaeckel as Pvt. Snowden
 Buddy Ebsen as T/Sgt. Tolliver
 Jon Shepodd as Cpl. John Jackson
 Peter van Eyck as SS Captain
 James Goodwin as Pfc. Ricks
 Steven Geray as Otto, German NCO
 Jud Taylor as Pvt. Jacob R. Abramowitz (credited as Judson Taylor) 
 Strother Martin as Sgt. Ingersol

Production
The film was based on Norman Brooks' stage play Fragile Fox. Director Aldrich bought the rights when he failed to obtain those for Irwin Shaw's The Young Lions and Norman Mailer's The Naked and the Dead.

Aldrich never saw the play on stage but had read it and liked what it said about war.

Owing to the nature of the film, which cast some officers as either cowards or Machiavellian manipulators, the US Defense Department refused to grant production assistance. Critics attacked this attitude, pointing out the heroic and noble behaviour of other officers like Costa and Woodruff who were "more representative of the Army than the cowardly captain, who is clearly an exception."

Aldrich said, "The Army saw the script and promptly laid down a policy of no cooperation, which not only meant that I couldn't borrow troops and tanks for my picture - I couldn't even get a look at Signal Corps combat footage. I finally had to buy a tank for $1,000 and rent another from 20th Century-Fox."

Rehearsals began on 5 January and filming started on 15 January.

Aldrich directed Attack! without the big budget that other war productions were getting at the time. It was shot in 32 days on the back lot of RKO Studios with a small cast and budget and a few pieces of military equipment, including the two muchmodified US M3 light tanks that inadequately portrayed German tanks.

The opening title sequence depicting off-duty soldiers was created by Saul Bass.

Eddie Albert, who played the cowardly Cooney, was in reality a decorated hero in the World War II Pacific Theater. Before the war he was secretly working for US Army intelligence, photographing German U-boats in Mexico. He was awarded the Bronze Star for heroism, rescuing US Marines during the Battle of Tarawa while under heavy gunfire in 1943. He also lost a portion of his hearing from the noise of the battle.

Reception
According to Aldrich the film made money but because the profits were "cross collateralized" against The Big Knife "nobody saw any of the money."

Accolades
The film is recognized by American Film Institute in these lists:
 2001: AFI's 100 Years...100 Thrills – Nominated

Home media
Attack was released to DVD by MGM Home Video on May 20, 2003 as a Region 1 fullscreen DVD and to Blu-ray on May 2, 2013 by the French company Filmedia (under license from MGM) as a Region 2 Blu-ray DVD.

See also
List of American films of 1956

References

External links
Norman A. Brooks papers at the University of Wyoming – American Heritage Center
 
 
 
 
 "Universal Backlot"

1956 films
1956 war films
American black-and-white films
American war films
Belgium in fiction
1950s English-language films
Films directed by Robert Aldrich
Films scored by Frank De Vol
Films set in Belgium
Films with screenplays by James Poe
United Artists films
American World War II films
World War II films based on actual events
Western Front of World War II films
1950s American films